Delhi School of Economics (DSE), popularly referred to as "D School", is a Higher Educational Institution within the University of Delhi. The Delhi School of Economics is situated in University of Delhi's North Campus in Maurice Nagar. Established in 1949, the campus of the Delhi School of Economics houses the University of Delhi's departments of Economics, Sociology, Geography and Commerce, as well as the Ratan Tata Library. Out of the four academic departments, the Departments of Economics, Sociology and Geography come under the Faculty of Social Sciences, while the Department of Commerce comes under the Faculty of Commerce and Business Studies.

Many of its former faculty members and alumni have gone ahead to become world famous economists, social scientists, writers, heads of states and journalists. It presently offers multiple post graduate and doctoral level programmes in a wide range of disciplines.

History and organisation

Shortly after the independence of India, a group led by Professor V.K.R.V. Rao and supported by India's first Prime Minister Jawaharlal Nehru, launched a project to create a centre for advanced studies in social sciences, which led to the formation of the Delhi School of Economics in 1949. Currently, the Delhi School of Economics houses the Departments of Economics, Geography, Sociology and Commerce.

Campus

The Delhi School of Economics campus is situated in University of Delhi's North Campus in Maurice Nagar. It is surrounded by other institutions and constituent colleges of the University of Delhi, such as the Faculty of Management Studies, the Institute of Economic Growth, St. Stephen's College and Hindu College. Three constituent departments of the Faculty of Social Sciences - Economics, Sociology and Geography- lie within the Delhi School of Economics campus. It additionally also houses the Department of Commerce, which is a part of the Faculty of Commerce and Business Studies, and the Ratan Tata Library.

Constituents

Department of Economics

Among the faculty at the department of economics have been the likes of V.K.R.V. Rao, B.N. Ganguly and K.N. Raj (all three of whom went on to serve as vice-chancellors at the University of Delhi), Amartya Sen (Nobel Laureate), Manmohan Singh (the former Indian Prime Minister and also the key architect of the economic reforms since 1991), Sukhomoy Chakravarty (who was chief economic advisor), Jagdish Bhagwati, Kaushik Basu, Arjun Kumar Sengupta, Partha Sen, Raj Krishna, Syed Mohammad Ali, the economic historian Tapan Raychaudhuri and others.

The department has been associated with three important journals over the years. It publishes the Indian Economic Review, several faculty members edit the Indian Economic and Social History Review, and for many years it housed the Journal of Quantitative Economics.

Department of Sociology

The department of sociology was established by the University of Delhi in 1959 as a constituent of the Delhi School of Economics. To begin with, the department trained students for two courses:  M.A. and Ph.D.  In 1966 a two-year course for the M.Litt. degree was introduced.  This has been replaced since 1976 by an M.Phil. degree course of a year's duration.  In 1968, the department was recognised as a Centre of Advanced Study (CAS) in Sociology by the University Grants Commission (UGC). The department receives a renewable five-year grant from the UGC under the CAS scheme. The UGC also provides a renewable three-year grant under its ASHISS (Assistance for Strengthening of the Infrastructure of the Humanities and Social Sciences) program for departmental infrastructure as well as research on State and Society.

In 2010, Professor Nandini Sundar from the department, won the Infosys prize in the field of social anthropology.

Department of Geography

The department traces its origin to October 1959, when under the initiative of Professor V.K.R.V. Rao, the then Vice-Chancellor of the university and an eminent Economist, a Department of Human Geography was established as a constituent of the Delhi School of Economics. Professor George Kuriyan, a well-known geographer of India at that time, was the first professor and founder of the department. In 1966, Professor V.L.S. Prakasha Rao took over from him and guided the department until 1973.

The department has expanded considerably since 1973. The name of the department was changed to the Department of Geography in 1976 to indicate the widening scope of teaching and research activity in physical and human aspects of Geography.

Department of Commerce

In December 1967, the Department of Commerce was established as a separate department by carving it out of the composite Department of Economics and Commerce, Delhi School of Economics. It became an independent faculty in 1992. Currently, along with the Department of Financial Studies, it constitutes the Faculty of Commerce and Business Studies. The Department of Commerce started a one-year full-time Post-graduate Diploma in International Marketing (PGDIM) in the year 1985–86. PGDIM remains as a management course in the Department of Commerce. PGDIM is currently coordinated with Sri Guru Gobind Singh College of Commerce, University of Delhi.

The department also offers a full-time two-year Master's programme in International Business (MIB), laying special emphasis on aspects of international business operations including Global Marketing and International Financial Management. The Master of Human Resource and Organisational Development (MHROD) programme was started by the department in 1995 to impart managerial competencies in the domain of Human Resource Management and Organizational Development.

From 2014, the MIB and MHROD courses have been restructured as MBA (IB) and MBA (HRD) respectively.

Ratan Tata Library

The Ratan Tata Library, popularly referred to as RTL, is also situated in the Delhi School of Economics campus. The total collection comprises 2.5 lakh volumes of books and bound periodicals. Nearly 1300 current titles are being received in the Library. The Library also receives Annual Reports of about 800 Joint Stock companies. It has a special collection on Pakistan to support research in the Area Studies Programme (Pakistan). The Library has been designated as a repository of United Nations publications.

Noted people

Notable faculty

Manmohan Singh, Former Prime Minister of India
Jagdish Bhagwati, Professor of economics and law at Columbia University
M.N. Srinivas, Indian Sociologist
Kaushik Basu, Senior Vice President and Chief Economist at World Bank
Veena Das, Krieger-Eisenhower Professor of Anthropology at Johns Hopkins University
Pranab Bardhan, Professor Emeritus of Economics at University of California, Berkeley
Sukhamoy Chakraborty (1934–1990), noted Indian economist
K.R. Narayanan, 10th President of India
Prasanta Pattanaik, Emeritus Professor, University of California, Riverside
Andre Beteille, Indian Sociologist & Padma Bhushan recipient
Raj Krishna
V. K. R. V. Rao, Vice Chancellor of Delhi University
Tapan Raychaudhuri
Amartya Sen, Nobel laureate
K. N. Raj
Padma Desai
Suresh Tendulkar
Ashok Mitra
Arjun Kumar Sengupta
Mrinal Datta Chaudhuri, Former director and Padma Bhushan recipient
R. S. Nigam, Former director and recipient of Lifetime Achievement award by A. P. J. Abdul Kalam 
J. P. S. Uberoi, retired professor

Notable alumni

DSE also has officially registered the Delhi School of Economics Alumni Association, which has facilitated alumni events in Mumbai and Washington D.C.
 Isher Judge Ahluwalia
 Ravi Batra, Indian-American economist
 Anjali Bhardwaj, Indian social activist working on issues of transparency and accountability
 Romola Butalia,  journalist and website editor
 Dhritiman Chatterjee, actor in Black, Pratidwandi
 Prabhu Chawla, editor of India Today
 Brahma Chellaney
 Parag Kumar Das, human rights activist and Assamese journalist assassinated in 1996
 Amitav Ghosh, author
 Manisha Girotra, Indian business executive
 Subir Gokarn, former Deputy Governor of the Reserve Bank of India
 Omkar Goswami, chairman and founder, CERG Advisory
 Ramachandra Guha, author, historian and columnist
 Ashok Gulati, Indian agricultural economist
 Nistula Hebbar, journalist and political correspondent
 Anshula Kant, Chief Financial Officer and managing director of the World Bank Group
 Ashwani Mahajan, National Co-Convener of Swadeshi Jagaran Manch (SJM)
 Amit Mitra, FICCI
 Bingu wa Mutharika, former President of Malawi
 V. R. Panchamukhi
 Sat Parashar, Indian financial management expert and business education administrator
 Om Prakash, an historian
 Vidya Rao, Hindustani classical singer and writer
 Prannoy Roy, media figure, founder of NDTV
 Kuladhar Saikia, Director General of Assam Police
 Rajan Saxena, Indian management expert
 Mihir Shah, Indian economist and former member of the erstwhile Planning Commission of India
 Sanjay Subrahmanyam, noted Indian historian
 Paranjoy Guha Thakurta, Indian journalist, political commentator, author and a documentary film maker
 Usha Thorat, Reserve Bank Of India
 Piers Vitebsky, British anthropologist

Academics

 Bina Agarwal, prize-winning development economist and Professor of Development Economics and Environment at the Global Development Institute at The University of Manchester
 Arindam Banik, Associated Cement Companies Chair Professor at International Management Institute, Editor, Global Business Review, Former Director of IMI Kolkata
 Amitava Bose
 Maitreesh Ghatak, Professor of Economics, LSE
 Gita Gopinath, Professor of Economics, Harvard University and Deputy Managing Director of the IMF
 Reetika Khera, one of India's leading development economists
 Shailendra Raj Mehta, President & Director of MICA
 Nadeem Naqvi
 Prasanta K. Pattanaik, Professor of Economics, University of California, Riverside, USA
 Rajan Saxena, management expert, Padma Shri awardee
 Gita Sen, adjunct professor at Harvard University and Professor Emeritus at the Indian Institute of Management Bangalore; feminist scholar and specialist in international population policy
 Suresh Tendulkar,  former chief of the National Statistical Commission and Chairman of Prime Minister Manmohan Singh's Economic Advisory Council (PMEAC) from 2004 to 2008
 Kamta Prasad, former professor of economics, Indian Institute for Public Administration and IIT Kanpur
 Sanjay Subrahmanyam, One of the world's leading historian. He holds the Irving and Jean Stone Endowed Chair in Social Sciences at UCLA.

Government
 Pulok Chatterji, 11th Principal Secretary to the Prime Minister of India
 Bibek Debroy, Chairman of the Economic Advisory Council to the Prime Minister (EAC-PM)
 Ruchira Kamboj, Ambassador & Permanent Representative of India to UNESCO Paris
 Pramod Kumar Misra, Principal Secretary to the Prime Minister of India
 Ashok Mitra, former Chief Economic Adviser to the Government of India
 Vinay Sheel Oberoi, Ambassador & Permanent Representative of India to UNESCO
 Iswar Prasanna Hazarika, former member of the Lok Sabha, director of NTPC, MMTC etc.
 Vinod Rai, 11th Comptroller and Auditor General of India
 Pankaj Saran, Deputy National Security Adviser of India
 N. K. Singh, Chairman of 15th Finance Commission
 Sujatha Singh, former Foreign Secretary of India
 Pradeep Kumar Sinha, IAS, Principal Advisor to the Prime Minister of India

See also
 Rameshwari Photocopy Service shop copyright case

References

External links
 

Educational institutions established in 1949
Universities and colleges in Delhi
Economics schools in India
Delhi University
Economy of Delhi
1949 establishments in India